Sophronia ascalis is a moth of the family Gelechiidae. It was described by László Anthony Gozmány in 1951. It is found in Germany, Austria, Croatia, Hungary, Romania, the Czech Republic, Slovakia, Slovenia, and North Macedonia.

References

Moths described in 1951
Sophronia (moth)